Impossible Engineering is a television series produced for Discovery's Science Channel in the US., UKTV's Yesterday in the UK, RMC Decouverte in France, Societe Radio-Canada's Ici Explora in Canada, SVT in Sweden, Discovery Italy in Italy as well as with other broadcasters around the world.

Each episode focuses on one modern-day engineering achievement, with historical segments about the engineering pioneers who helped pave the way for present-day engineers. Each one-hour-long programme details how giant structures, record-beating buildings, and the world's most cutting-edge ships, trains, and planes are built and work using 3D graphics, archives, and specially shot footage.

As of January 2020, five series of Impossible Engineering have been produced. In addition, two series of a spin-off called Impossible Railways in most territories and Impossible Engineering: Extreme Railroads in the US have been produced.

The series is produced by British independent production company Twofour Broadcast

Episodes of Impossible Engineering 
This is a listing of every episode of Impossible Engineering broadcast by UKTV to date. The episode titles shown here are the titles that UKTV use and are listed on their website. Other broadcasters may have different titles for each episode.

Series 1 
Series 1 premiered in April 2015.

Series 2 
This series premiered from March 2017 in the US.

Series 3 
This series premiered from January 2019 in the US.

Series 4 
This series premiered from January 2020 in both the US and the UK. In the US this series was split down into smaller series and broadcast throughout the year.

Series 5 
Series 5 came out in 2020.

Series 6

Series 7

Episodes of Impossible Railways

Series 1

Series 2

References 

Documentary television series about technology
2015 British television series debuts
Science Channel original programming
UKTV original programming
Television series by ITV Studios